Olesya Zamula (born February 17, 1984 in Riga, Latvian SSR) is an amateur Azerbaijani wrestler, who competed in the women's middleweight category. She won the bronze medal for her division at the 2011 European Wrestling Championships in Dortmund, Germany. She is also a member of Atasport Wrestling Club in Baku, and is coached and trained by Semjon Kapitannikov.

Zamula represented her current nation Azerbaijan at the 2008 Summer Olympics in Beijing, where she competed for the women's 63 kg. She received a bye for the second preliminary match, before losing out by a technical fall to Japan's Kaori Icho. Because her opponent advanced further into the final match, Zamula was offered another shot for the bronze medal by entering the repechage bouts. She was pinned in the second period by American wrestler Randi Miller, who eventually won the bronze medal in this event.

References

External links
Profile – International Wrestling Database
NBC 2008 Olympics profile

Azerbaijani female sport wrestlers
1984 births
Living people
Olympic wrestlers of Azerbaijan
Wrestlers at the 2008 Summer Olympics
Sportspeople from Riga
21st-century Azerbaijani women